The 2011–12 North Dakota State Bison men's basketball team represented North Dakota State University in the 2011–12 NCAA Division I men's basketball season. The Bison, led by head coach Saul Phillips, played their home games at Bison Sports Arena in Fargo, North Dakota, as members of the Summit League. After finishing 5th in the Summit during the regular season, and was eliminated in the first round of the Summit League tournament by Western Illinois.

North Dakota State failed to qualify for the NCAA tournament, but received a bid to the 2012 College Basketball Invitational. The Bison were eliminated in the first round of the CBI by Wyoming, 78–75.

Roster 

Source

Schedule and results

|-
!colspan=9 style=|Exhibition

|-
!colspan=9 style=|Regular season

|-
!colspan=9 style=| Summit League tournament

|-
!colspan=9 style=| CBI

Source

References

North Dakota State Bison men's basketball seasons
North Dakota State
North Dakota State
North Dakota State Bison men's basketball
North Dakota State Bison men's basketball